Caesars Entertainment, Inc., formerly Eldorado Resorts, Inc., is an American hotel and casino entertainment company founded and based in Reno, Nevada that operates more than 50 properties. Eldorado Resorts acquired Caesars Entertainment Corporation and changed its own name to Caesars Entertainment on July 20, 2020.

History

1973 - 2000 
The company traces its history back to the development of the Eldorado Hotel in Reno, which was opened on May 24, 1973, by a group of investors that included Don Carano and other members of the Carano family.

On July 28, 1995, the Eldorado opened the adjacent Silver Legacy Resort Casino in partnership with Circus Circus Enterprises.

The Eldorado companies were reorganized in 1996 as Eldorado Resorts LLC in connection with a $100-million bond offering.

2000 - 2020 
In 2005, the company took over the bankrupt Hollywood Casino Shreveport in Louisiana, buying a 76 percent stake in the property for $154 million. It was then rebranded as the Eldorado Casino Shreveport.

In 2013, Eldorado agreed to combine with the publicly traded MTR Gaming Group in a reverse merger. The merger would add three racinos in Ohio, Pennsylvania, and West Virginia to Eldorado's portfolio. The transaction closed on September 19, 2014, creating Eldorado Resorts Inc. in its present form. Eldorado's existing owners held 50.2 percent of the combined company, and Gary Carano was appointed as its chairman and CEO.

In November 2015, Eldorado bought Circus Circus Reno and the 50% stake in the Silver Legacy that it did not already own from MGM Resorts International for $73 million.

In May 2017, Eldorado acquired Isle of Capri Casinos for $1.7 billion in cash, stock, and assumed debt, adding twelve casinos to its holdings.

In August 2018, Eldorado bought the Grand Victoria Casino in Illinois for $328 million. Two months later, Eldorado acquired the operating business of Tropicana Entertainment for $640 million, adding seven casinos to its portfolio. Gaming and Leisure Properties simultaneously purchased the real estate of five of the casinos and leased them to Eldorado for a total of $88 million per year. Additionally, Eldorado paid $246 million for the real estate underlying Tropicana's Lumière Place casino in Missouri.

In early 2019, Eldorado sold Presque Isle Downs and the operations of Lady Luck Casino Nemacolin to Churchill Downs, Inc. for a total of $179 million.

In March 2019, it was reported that Eldorado was discussing a merger with Caesars Entertainment. In June 2019, Caesars accepted Eldorado's offer to purchase Caesars for $18 billion in stock and cash. Eldorado operated 26 assets compared to Caesars, which controlled 53. Eldorado would change its name to Caesars Entertainment after the completion of the acquisition, and the companies' loyalty programs would be combined under the Caesars Rewards brand. Eldorado's key executives would be retained. The deal was expected to be completed in the middle of 2020.

2020 - present 
With the Caesars acquisition pending, Eldorado sold three properties (Lady Luck Casino Caruthersville, Mountaineer Casino Racetrack and Resort and Isle Casino Cape Girardeau) to Vici Properties and Century Casinos for a total of $385 million, with Vici acquiring the real estate assets and Century acquiring the operating businesses. Eldorado also sold Lady Luck Casino Vicksburg and Isle of Capri Casino Kansas City to Twin River Worldwide Holdings for $230 million. The deals were intended to reduce Eldorado's debt level and avert potential antitrust issues in Missouri, where Eldorado and Caesars together owned 6 of the state's 13 casinos.

In April 2020, Eldorado agreed to sell Eldorado Shreveport and the MontBleu casino in Lake Tahoe to Twin River.

On June 26, 2020, the Federal Trade Commission approved Eldorado's acquisition of Caesars. The transaction was completed on July 20 for $8.5 billion in cash and stock.

In April 2021, the company acquired the sports betting company William Hill for $3.7 billion. Most of William Hill's offerings in the U.S. would be rebranded as Caesars Sportsbook. In September 2021, Caesars agreed to sell William Hill's European business to 888 Holdings for $3 billion.

In Indiana, the company was required to sell three of its properties as a condition of approval of the Caesars merger. In 2021, the operating businesses of Tropicana Evansville and Caesars Southern Indiana were sold to Bally's Corporation (the former Twin River Worldwide Holdings) and the Eastern Band of Cherokee Indians, respectively, for a total of $390 million.

In July 2021, Caesars sold its casinos in Europe and Africa (the former London Clubs International) to an affiliate of Silver Point Capital.

In February 2022, Caesars Entertainment announced a multi-year deal which named the organisation as the official sportsbook partner of the NBA outfit the Cleveland Cavaliers. The company plans to open a 10,355 square foot retail sportsbook at Rocket Mortgage FieldHouse the home of the Cavaliers by the end of 2022. In November 2022, Caesars was added to the list of "Best Employers for Veterans" by Forbes. 

They also offer mobile gambling options.

List of properties
The properties owned and operated by Caesars Entertainment are:

Circus Circus Reno — Reno, Nevada
The Cromwell — Paradise, Nevada
Eldorado Gaming Scioto Downs — Columbus, Ohio
Eldorado Reno — Reno, Nevada
Flamingo Las Vegas — Paradise, Nevada
Grand Victoria Casino Elgin — Elgin, Illinois
Harrah's Hoosier Park — Anderson, Indiana
Horseshoe Baltimore — Baltimore, Maryland (50% interest)
Horseshoe Black Hawk — Black Hawk, Colorado
Horseshoe Indianapolis — Shelbyville, Indiana
Horseshoe Lake Charles — Lake Charles, Louisiana
Horseshoe Las Vegas — Paradise, Nevada
Isle Casino Hotel Bettendorf — Bettendorf, Iowa
Isle Casino Hotel Waterloo — Waterloo, Iowa
Isle Casino Racing Pompano Park — Pompano Beach, Florida
Isle of Capri Casino Hotel Boonville — Boonville, Missouri
Isle of Capri Casino Hotel Lula — Lula, Mississippi
Lady Luck Casino Black Hawk — Black Hawk, Colorado
The Linq — Paradise, Nevada
Paris Las Vegas — Paradise, Nevada
Planet Hollywood Las Vegas — Paradise, Nevada
Silver Legacy Reno — Reno, Nevada

The following properties are operated by the company under a lease or a management agreement:

Caesars Atlantic City — Atlantic City, New Jersey
Caesars Palace — Paradise, Nevada
Caesars Windsor — Windsor, Ontario
Harrah's Ak-Chin — Maricopa, Arizona
Harrah's Atlantic City — Atlantic City, New Jersey
Harrah's Cherokee — Cherokee, North Carolina
Harrah's Cherokee Valley River — Murphy, North Carolina
Harrah's Council Bluffs – Council Bluffs, Iowa
Harrah's Gulf Coast – Biloxi, Mississippi
Harrah's Joliet – Joliet, Illinois
Harrah's Lake Tahoe – Stateline, Nevada
Harrah's Las Vegas – Paradise, Nevada
Harrah's Laughlin — Laughlin, Nevada
Harrah's Metropolis – Metropolis, Illinois
Harrah's New Orleans — New Orleans, Louisiana
Harrah's North Kansas City – North Kansas City, Missouri
Harrah's Philadelphia – Chester, Pennsylvania
Harrah's Southern California — Valley Center, California
Harveys Lake Tahoe – Stateline, Nevada
Horseshoe Bossier City – Bossier City, Louisiana
Horseshoe Council Bluffs – Council Bluffs, Iowa
Horseshoe Hammond – Hammond, Indiana
Horseshoe St. Louis — St. Louis, Missouri
Horseshoe Tunica – Robinsonville, Mississippi
Rio All Suite Hotel and Casino — Paradise, Nevada
Tropicana Atlantic City — Atlantic City, New Jersey
Tropicana Laughlin — Laughlin, Nevada
Trop Casino Greenville — Greenville, Mississippi

Former properties
Bally's Atlantic City — Atlantic City, New Jersey
Belle of Baton Rouge — Baton Rouge, Louisiana
Caesars Southern Indiana — Elizabeth, Indiana
Eldorado Shreveport — Shreveport, Louisiana
Harrah's Louisiana Downs – Bossier City, Louisiana
Isle Casino Cape Girardeau — Cape Girardeau, Missouri
Isle of Capri Casino Kansas City — Kansas City, Missouri
Lady Luck Casino Caruthersville — Caruthersville, Missouri
Lady Luck Casino Nemacolin — Farmington, Pennsylvania
Lady Luck Casino Vicksburg — Vicksburg, Mississippi
London Clubs International (12 casinos in the United Kingdom, Egypt, and South Africa)
MontBleu Casino Resort — Stateline, Nevada
Mountaineer Casino Racetrack & Resort — Chester, West Virginia
Presque Isle Downs & Casino — Summit Township, Pennsylvania
Tropicana Evansville — Evansville, Indiana

References

External links
 

 
1996 establishments in Nevada
American companies established in 1996
Companies based in Reno, Nevada
Companies listed on the Nasdaq
Gambling companies established in 1996
Hospitality companies established in 1996
Gambling companies of the United States
Hospitality companies of the United States